Mashiho Chiri (February 24, 1909  June 9, 1961) was an Ainu linguist and anthropologist. He was best known for creating Ainu-Japanese dictionaries.

Biography 
Chiri was born on February 24, 1909, in what is now Noboribetsu, Hokkaido, Japan. His older sister is Yukie Chiri and his aunt is Imekanu. Though they were both native Ainu speakers, Chiri was not. He was taught Japanese, and learned the Ainu language when he was in high school.

He graduated from the Hokkaido Muroran Sakae High School. He had excellent grades, but couldn't afford go to college. Instead he worked at a local government office. Chiri took him up on his offer, and graduated in 1933. He then studied at the Tokyo Imperial University and graduated from the literature department in 1937. He was the first Ainu to enter the university. He earned a master's degree at the same university. Chiri taught at a girls' school and researched at a museum in Karafuto for three years before taking a temporary position at Hokkaido University in 1943. He became a full professor in 1947, and was awarded a doctorate on December 22, 1954.

Ainu language 
Chiri's academic work focused on the Ainu language. He won the 1954 Asahi Prize for writing a classified Ainu language dictionary.

Chiri also translated Ainu stories, which were passed down orally because the Ainu did not have a written language. His translation style was meant to reflect the performative nature of how the stories were told, and he did this by writing them in colloquial Japanese and improvising. He also translated certain words like "vagina" and "ejaculation" into German in order to avoid censorship, though they were written using katakana in his translations. This style was criticized by later scholars for summarizing content and adding new sentences, and some re-translated his work in a more traditional style.

Selected bibliography

Further reading

References 

1909 births
1961 deaths
Japanese Ainu people
Japanese anthropologists
Linguists from Japan
Academic staff of Hokkaido University
20th-century anthropologists
20th-century linguists
People from Hokkaido